The Juraj Dobrila University of Pula is a university in Pula, Croatia. It was founded in 2006 and has eleven constituents.

History
The establishment of the Juraj Dobrila University of Pula at the beginning of 21st century is an important part of the restructuring of the Croatian system of higher education. Grouping the institutions of higher education in an autonomous university and establishing the department-type university has been a complex project. The foundation of the University of Pula takes into consideration the historical and cultural assumptions of location and development of Istria in past centuries. Historical-traditional, training-educational and other assumptions of cultural development are important factors for founding the University of Pula.

The 1950s in Istria were marked with the thought of getting more people into higher education, especially into economic and teacher professions. Two prominent Istrian intellectuals, Mijo Mirković and Tone Peruško, gave the decisive impulse of forming that point of view. The first two-year economic college (Higher School of Economics) was opened due to Mirković contribution in the academic year 1960/61, and in 1961/62 Peruško contributed by opening the Pedagogic Academy. Peruško was also the first head-master of the academy. The Higher School of Economics developed into the Faculty of Economics and Tourism "Dr. Mijo Mirković", and the Pedagogic Academy into the Faculty of Philosophy in Pula and teacher training college in Pula. Mijo Mirković suggested the establishment of an Adriatic University which would have consisted of faculties with seats in the major cities on the coast.

The opening of the two higher education institutions in Istria at the beginning of the 1960s was logical consequence derived from the envisaged future of the area. The idea was based on the two main directions of development: economy and education. In the second half of the 20th century this way of development did not change radically. These directions are currently still the major ones, but with specialities in many new courses nowadays. The study of economics now comprises three courses: finance, marketing and tourism. The study of educational sciences does not only offer a teacher training study, which had the longest tradition, but also offers new studies that appeared recently (Croatian language and literature, Italian language and literature, history, Latin language and Roman literature). These new studies cover schooling necessary for teachers and enabling employment in other services. Restructuring institutions of higher education and opening new studies and courses was meant to enhance the potential of higher education in Istria.

The Juraj Dobrila University of Pula was officially founded on 29 September 2006 when the Croatian Parliament passed the Act of Founding the University of Pula. The University of Pula was entered in the Register of the Commercial Court in Pazin on 21 December 2006, thus acquiring its legal status.

Constituents of the University 

The Juraj Dobrila University of Pula is an entirely integrated university, consisting of the following constituents:

Academy of Music in Pula
Department of Engineering
Department of Natural and Health Sciences
Faculty of Economics and Tourism "Dr. Mijo Mirković"
Faculty of Educational Sciences
Faculty of Humanities
Faculty of Informatics
Faculty of Interdisciplinary, Italian and Cultural Studies
Institute for Science and Technology VISIO
Student Centre Pula
University Library

See also
 List of colleges and universities
 Pula

References

External links
 
 University of Pula Website 
 Info Pula 

Universities and colleges in Croatia
University
Educational institutions established in 2006
2006 establishments in Croatia
Universities and colleges formed by merger